The 1980 WCT World Doubles was a men's tennis tournament played on indoor carpet courts at Olympia in London, Great Britain that was part of the 1980 Volvo Grand Prix. It was the tour finals for the doubles season of the WCT Tour section. The tournament was held from January 2 through January 6, 1980.

Final

Doubles

 Brian Gottfried /  Raúl Ramírez defeated  Wojtek Fibak /  Tom Okker 3–6, 6–4, 6–4, 3–6, 6–3

References

WCT World Doubles
World Championship Tennis World Doubles